W.A.K.O. World Championships 1993 in Budapest were the joint ninth world kickboxing championships hosted by the W.A.K.O. organization arranged by Hungarian kickboxing president Richard Leyrer.  As with the 1985 world championships the organization had suffered a temporary split due to political differences, and a previous event had been held in Atlantic City earlier in the month.  These political differences would be resolved in the near future and the organization would be re-united.   

The Budapest event was open to amateur men and women from across the world - with 500 participants taking part from 47 countries.  The styles on offer were Full-Contact, and for the first time ever at a W.A.K.O. championships, Low-Kick (more information on the styles can be found in the relevant sections below).  Another first was that women could now take part in Full-Contact kickboxing, whereas before they could only take part in less physical styles.  At the end of a very competitive championships, Poland were the top nation in terms of medals won, with Morocco a very close second and France just behind in third.  The event was held in Budapest, Hungary over four days, starting on Thursday, 25 November and finishing on Sunday, 28 November.  An estimated 3,500 spectators attended the championships.

Full-Contact

Making a re-appearance to a W.A.K.O. world championships after being absent at London 1991, Full-Contact involved the participants trying to win the contest either by points or by stoppage – more detail on the rules can be found at the W.A.K.O. website, although be aware that they may have changed slightly since 1993.  The men had twelve weight classes ranging from 51 kg/112.2 lbs to over 91 kg/+200.2 lbs, with several new divisions being added, while, for the first time ever, women were allowed to participate in Full-Contact at a W.A.K.O. event, with six weight divisions ranging from 48 kg/105.6 lbs to over 65 kg/+143 lbs. Poland was the strongest country in Full-Contact with four gold, one silver and one bronze medal by the end of the championships.

Men's Full-Contact Kickboxing Medals Table

Women's Full-Contact Kickboxing Medals Table

Low-Kick

Making its debut at a W.A.K.O. championships, Low-Kick is similar to Full-Contact kickboxing only differing in that it allowed kicks below the knee - more detail on Low-Kick rules can be found at the W.A.K.O. website, although be aware that there may have been some rule changes since 1993.  Only men were allowed to participate in Low-Kick with twelve weight classes ranging from 51 kg/112.2 lbs to over 91 kg/+200.2 lbs.  A notable winner was Andrei Dudko (who would later win the K-1 USA Championships 2000) taking gold in the +91 kg division.  Morocco were the strongest nation in Low-Kick winning four gold medals.

Men's Low-Kick Kickboxing Medals Table

Overall Medals Standing (Top 5)

See also
List of WAKO Amateur World Championships
List of WAKO Amateur European Championships
List of male kickboxers
List of female kickboxers

References

External links
 WAKO World Association of Kickboxing Organizations Official Site

WAKO Amateur World Championships events
Kickboxing in Hungary
1993 in kickboxing
International sports competitions in Budapest